The Kölner Stadt-Anzeiger (KStA) is a German daily newspaper published in Cologne, and has the largest circulation in the Cologne–Bonn Metropolitan Region. Kölner Stadt-Anzeiger has a base of over 100 contributing editors and a wide network of correspondents for local and regional news reporting.

History
The Kölner Stadt-Anzeiger first appeared in 1876 as a local equivalent of the national Kölnische Zeitung (Cologne Gazette). Toward the end of World War II, both newspapers had to cease publication.

In October 1949 the Cologne Stadt-Anzeiger published again. Under fierce competition, it developed by the late 1950s into the leading newspaper of the Cologne region. Since 1960, Professor Alfred Neven DuMont of M. DuMont Schauberg has been the sole editor of the newspaper. Since 2004, Konstantin Neven DuMont has been its managing director.  Chief editor of the paper is Peter Pauls.

See also 
 List of newspapers in Germany
 Irene Meichsner
 Gerhard Fauth

References

 M. Manfred Pohl, M. DuMont Schauberg. DuMont Schauberg. The struggle for the independence of the newspaper publishing under the Nazi dictatorship, Frankfurt, New York, Campus Verlag 2009

External links

  

German-language newspapers
Daily newspapers published in Germany
Newspapers published in Cologne
Publications established in 1876
1876 establishments in Germany